Charles Eugene "Tuffy" Stewart (July 31, 1883 – November 18, 1934) was a Major League Baseball outfielder. In 11 career games, he had 1 hit in 9 at-bats. He batted and threw left-handed.

Stewart was born and died in Chicago, Illinois.

External links

1883 births
1934 deaths
Chicago Cubs players
Major League Baseball outfielders
Baseball players from Chicago
Indianapolis Indians players